The Nightingale is a novel by the American writer Agnes Sligh Turnbull (1888–1982) set in a fictional rural Western Pennsylvania village (but much like the author's birthplace of New Alexandria, Pennsylvania, about thirty miles east of Pittsburgh) at the turn of the 20th century.

Violet Carpenter is already considered a spinster at age twenty-five when financial necessity forces her to take in lodgers. Her avocation, however, is to write poetry. To her astonishment, both paths lead to romantic crossroads.

References

1960 American novels
Novels set in Pennsylvania
Houghton Mifflin books